The Voice of Poland (season 4) began airing 1 March 2014 on TVP 2.

Hosts and coaches

On January 7, 2014, Edyta Górniak announced she would be leaving the show in order to concentrate on her music career. On February 1, 2014, it was announced that Justyna Steczkowska, who served as a judge in the second season, will return to replace Edyta Górniak. The other judges will be Tomson & Baron, Maria Sadowska and Marek Piekarczyk. All hosts from the previous season will return.

Auditions
Auditions took place on December 13 and 14, 2013 and January 10 and 11, 2014 in Warsaw.

Teams
Color key

Blind auditions
The blind auditions were taped from February 12 to 15, 2014.

Color keys

Episode 1 (March 1, 2014)
The coaches performed "Tysiące głosów", polish version of "One Thousand Voices", at the start of the show.

Episode 2 (March 1, 2014)

Episode 3 (March 8, 2014)

Episode 4 (March 8, 2014)

Episode 5 (March 15, 2014)

Episode 6 (March 15, 2014)

Episode 7 (March 22, 2014)

Episode 8 (March 22, 2014)

Episode 9 (March 29, 2014)

Episode 10 (March 29, 2014)

The Battle rounds
The Battle rounds were taped from March 17 to 19, 2014.

Katarzyna Markiewicz could not arrive to take part in Battle rounds due to health problems. On March 23, 2014, she died at the age of 38, due to cervical cancer with multiple metastases. Sławomir Ramian, who would be her battle partner, was put straight through and performed "Moja i twoja nadzieja" as a tribute.

Color keys

Episode 11 (April 5, 2014)

Episode 12 (April 12, 2014)

Episode 13 (April 19, 2014)

The Knockouts
Before each knockout round the coach chooses two artists from their team to get a "fast pass" to the live shows, the remaining six artists from that team are then split up into two groups of three. At the end of each knockout round the coach then decides out of the three artists who wins, and therefore makes up their four artists to take to the live shows.

Episode 14 (April 26, 2014)
Color keys

Live Shows

Color keys

Episode 15 (May 3, 2014)

Episode 16 (May 10, 2014)

Semifinal (May 17, 2014)

Final (May 24, 2014)

Results summary of live shows
Color keys
Artist's info

Result details

Artists' appearances on earlier talent shows
Marta Dryll was a contestant on the first season of Bitwa na głosy.
Katarzyna Sawczuk appeared on the season two of Mam talent!.
Anna Deko appeared on the second season of Bitwa na głosy. Later she was a contestant on the third season of X Factor. She was eliminated at the Bootcamp stage.
Michał Chmielewski sang in the blind auditions of season two of The Voice of Poland and failed to make a team, but was able to turn a chair this season.
Kinga Kowalkowska, Igor Marinow and Klaudia Trzepizur competed on Must Be the Music. Tylko muzyka – seasons one, two and five respectively.
Monika Pilarczyk auditioned for Mam talent! – season four.
Tobiasz Pietrzyk sang in the blind auditions of season two of The Voice of Poland, but failed to turn any chairs.
Michał Karpacki was among the Top 10 finalists on Idol – season three.

Ratings

 Includes advert breaks

References

The Voice of Poland
2014 Polish television seasons